Roberta Bonanomi (born 15 October 1966) is a retired racing cyclist from Italy. She represented her native country at five Summer Olympics: 1984, 1988, 1992, 1996, and 2000. Her biggest achievements were winning the 1989 Giro d'Italia Femminile and the world title in the women's team time trial (1988), alongside Maria Canins, Monica Bandini, and Francesca Galli.

Major results

1982 
1st  Road Race, National Junior Road Championships

1983 
2nd Vertemate con Minoprio

1986
5th Vertemate con Minoprio

1987 
3rd Pernod–Super Prestige
3rd Team Time Trial, UCI Road World Championships
5th Vertemate con Minoprio
10th Overall Tour of Norway

1988 
1st  Team Time Trial, UCI Road World Championships
4th Vertemate con Minoprio

1989 
1st  Overall Giro d'Italia Femminile
1st  Overall Tour of Norway
1st Stage 5
2nd Team Time Trial, UCI Road World Championships
4th Vertemate con Minoprio

1990 
1st GP Conad
2nd Vertemate con Minoprio

1991 
1st  Time Trial, National Road Championships
2nd Vertemate con Minoprio

1992 
2nd Settimana di Bergamo

1993 
3rd Team Time Trial, UCI Road World Championships

1994 
1st Osio Sopra
1st Bagni di Lucca
2nd Overall Giro del Trentino Alto Adige - Südtirol
2nd Villafranca di Forlì Chrono
3rd Vertemate con Minoprio

1995 
1st Stage 12 Grande Boucle Féminine Internationale
2nd Time Trial, National Road Championships
2nd Overall Masters Féminin
1st Stage 2
2nd Overall Giro della Toscana Int. Femminile
3rd Overall Giro d'Italia Femminile
6th Road Race, UCI Road World Championships

1996 
4th Vertemate con Minoprio

1997 
1st Stage 4 Giro del Trentino Alto Adige - Südtirol
3rd Time Trial, National Road Championships

1999 
1st Hamilton City
5th La Flèche Wallonne

2000 
1st Stage 5 Giro d'Italia Femminile

References

External links

1966 births
Living people
People from Sotto il Monte Giovanni XXIII
Italian female cyclists
Cyclists at the 1984 Summer Olympics
Cyclists at the 1988 Summer Olympics
Cyclists at the 1992 Summer Olympics
Cyclists at the 1996 Summer Olympics
Cyclists at the 2000 Summer Olympics
Olympic cyclists of Italy
UCI Road World Champions (women)
Cyclists from the Province of Bergamo